Alexander Fuller-Acland-Hood, 1st Baron St Audries PC (26 September 1853 – 4 June 1917), known as Sir Alexander Fuller-Acland-Hood, Bt, until 1911, was a British Conservative Party politician. He served as Parliamentary Secretary to the Treasury (Chief Whip) under Arthur Balfour from 1902 to 1905.

Background
Fuller-Acland-Hood was the son of Sir Alexander Fuller-Acland-Hood, 3rd Baronet, by his wife Isabel, daughter of Sir Peregrine Palmer-Fuller-Acland, 2nd Baronet. He was a descendant of Alexander Hood, uncle of Lord Hood and Lord Bridport. He succeeded his father in the baronetcy in 1892. In 1905 he also succeeded his kinsman as 6th Baronet of Hartington Hall.

Political career
Fuller-Acland-Hood sat as Member of Parliament for Wellington, Somerset from 1892 until 1911. He was appointed Vice-Chamberlain of the Household under Lord Salisbury in 1900, a post he held until November 1902, and then served as Parliamentary Secretary to the Treasury (Chief Whip) under Arthur Balfour from August 1902 until 1905. He was sworn of the Privy Council in 1904 and raised to the peerage as Baron St Audries, of St Audries in the County of Somerset, in 1911.

Family
Lord St Audries married the Hon. Mildred Rose Evelyn, daughter of Dayrolles Blakeney Eveleigh-de-Moleyns, 4th Baron Ventry, in 1888. They had two sons and two daughters. He died in June 1917, aged 63, and was succeeded in his titles by his eldest son, Alexander. Lady St Audries died in October 1949.

References

External links 
 

|-

St Audries, Alexander Fuller-Acland-Hood, 1st Baron
St Audries, Alexander Fuller-Acland-Hood, 1st Baron
Saint Audries, Alexander Fuller-Acland-Hood, 1st Baron
Conservative Party (UK) MPs for English constituencies
Saint Audries, Alexander Fuller-Acland-Hood, 1st Baron
UK MPs 1892–1895
UK MPs 1895–1900
UK MPs 1900–1906
UK MPs 1906–1910
UK MPs 1910
UK MPs 1910–1918
UK MPs who were granted peerages
Alexander
Saint Audries, Alexander Fuller-Acland-Hood, 1st Baron
Barons created by George V